The Lee Aaron Project is the first studio album by singer Lee Aaron, released in 1982 through Freedom Records. It was reissued on 18 May 1984 through Attic Records as Lee Aaron (not to be confused with her 1987 self-titled album).

Track listing

Personnel

Lee Aaron – lead vocals
Buzz Shearman – lead vocals (tracks 4, 8), background vocals (track 8)
Dave Aplin – guitar (tracks 1, 7)
Rik Emmett – guitar (track 1), production
Rick Santers – guitar (tracks 2–4, 6, 8, 9)
Earl Johnson – guitar (tracks 4, 6, 8)
Frank Soda – guitar (track 5)
John Albani – guitar (track 10)
George Bernhardt – guitar (track 10)
Bill Wade – drums (tracks 1, 7)
Mark Santers – drums (tracks 2–4, 6, 8, 9)
Glen Gratto – drums (track 5)
Randy Infuso – drums (track 10)
Gene Stout – bass (tracks 1, 7)
Rick Lazaroff – bass (tracks 2–4, 6, 8, 9)
Peter Crolly – bass (track 5)
Jack Meli – bass (track 10)
Mavis Kirteme – background vocals (track 1)
Paul Massey – engineering
Robin Brouwers – engineering
Ed Stone – engineering
Robert Connolly – production

References

Lee Aaron albums
1982 debut albums
Attic Records albums
Albums recorded at Metalworks Studios